Dolphin Square is a block of private flats with some ground floor business units near the River Thames in Pimlico, Westminster, London built between 1935 and 1937. Until the building of Highbury Square, it was the most developed garden square in London built as private housing. At one time, it was home to more than 70 MPs and at least 10 Lords.

At the time of its construction, its 1,250 upmarket flats were billed by Sir Nikolaus Pevsner as the "largest self-contained block of flats in Europe".  To an extent, their design has been a model for later municipal developments.

History

Dolphin Square is on the site of the former works of the developer and builder Thomas Cubitt who created the surrounding Pimlico district in the 19th century. The Royal Army Clothing Depot was built on the site after Cubitt's death and stood until 1933 when the leasehold on the site reverted to the Duke of Westminster. An American firm, the Fred F. French Companies, bought the freehold for the site from the Duke with plans to build a large residential development, provisionally named Ormonde Court. Although the planning stage was successfully concluded with the LCC by January 1935, French still needed financial backing for the enterprise. At the same time, he had over-extended his credit during his recent developments in New York City such as Tudor City and Knickerbocker Village and found himself unable to repay interest on earlier deals. Needing a new backer, French sold his obligations to Richard Costain Ltd., run by Richard Rylands Costain. New plans were drawn up by the architect S. Gordon Jeeves, and building started in September 1935. Lord Amulree formally opened the building on 25 November 1936.

A. P. Herbert, writing in Dolphin Square (a promotional booklet produced for Costains in 1935, with illustrations by H. M. Bateman) described the Square as "a city of 1,250 flats, each enjoying at the same time most of the advantages of the separate house and the big communal dwelling place". The provision of a restaurant made him fear that "fortunate wives will not have enough to do. A little drudgery is good for wives, perhaps. The Dolphin lady may be spoiled". On purchasing the site, Costain remarked to a colleague: "in two or three years we'll either drive up to this spot in a Rolls-Royce, or we'll be standing here selling matches".

In 1958, Costains sold Dolphin Square, as it was now known, for £2.4 million to Sir Maxwell Joseph, who sold it to Lintang Investments in 1959 for £3.1 million. Westminster City Council bought the lease of the block for £4.5 million in the mid-1960s, and subsequently sub-let it to the Dolphin Square Trust, an effective housing association, which had been newly created for the purpose. In January 2006, the Trust and the Council sold Dolphin Square to the American Westbrook Holdings group for £200 million.

Accommodation is provided in 13 blocks (or "houses"), each named after a famous navigator or admiral. At the south (Thames) side of the Square the houses are Grenville, Drake, Raleigh and Hawkins. Moving from the river up the west side, there are Nelson, Howard, Beatty, and Duncan. A hotel and administration offices, on the north side of the Square, are in Dolphin House, previously known as Rodney. Heading south from the hotel there are Keyes, Hood, Collingwood and Frobisher.

The estate contains a swimming pool, bar, brasserie (all of which were renovated in 2008), gymnasium, and shopping arcade. In the basement are a launderette and car park. A tennis court and croquet lawn overlook the River Thames. Until 21 January 1970, London Transport bus route 134 showed PIMLICO Dolphin Square as a destination and terminated in Chichester Street.

On 16 September 2020, Axa Investment Managers - Real Assets, a real estate portfolio and asset manager, announced that it had acquired Dolphin Square on behalf of clients.

Architecture 
Costains appointed the architect Gordon Jeeves to design Dolphin Square and he was assisted by Cecil Eve. Oscar Faber was the consultant engineer. Up to that point, Dolphin Square was Jeeves's largest project and he had played a part in designing other London buildings such as the National Radiator Building and later at Berkeley Square House. Dolphin Square is a neo-Georgian building and has a reinforced concrete structure with external facings of brick and stone. Original sound proofing was provided by compressed cork insulation in the floors. The original cost for the construction of  Dolphin Square and its 1,310 flats was around £2,000,000. In total, it was estimated that 200,000 tonnes of earth was moved, 125,000 tons of concrete used, 12 million bricks used on the external walls and 6,700 Crittal windows installed during construction.

When it opened it had flats varying in size from one-bedroom suites to flats with five bedrooms, a maid's room and three bathrooms. Onsite facilities provided for residents when completed included shops, a children's centre and nursery, library and, in the basement, a garage for up to 300 cars. The planned riverside wharf, which would have included a cafe, marina and a terraced garden leading from Grosvenor Road to the Thames, was never built.

The 3.5 acres (1.4 ha) of communal gardens were designed by Richard Sudell, president of the Institute of Landscape Architects, and since 2018 are (unlike the building) Grade II listed. The gardens are a mix of formal and informal planting with expanses of lawn, with areas themed to reflect garden styles from different parts of the world. The gardens and buildings form part of the Dolphin Square conservation area.

Residents

The proximity of Dolphin Square to the Palace of Westminster and the headquarters of the intelligence agencies MI5 (Thames House) and MI6 (Vauxhall Cross) has attracted many politicians, peers, civil servants and intelligence agency personnel as residents.

Politicians who have lived in the development include Harold Wilson, David Steel, William Hague, Estelle Morris, Beverley Hughes, Michael Mates, John Langford-Holt and Iain Mills. (Mills died in his flat in the square's Duncan House.)

Other notable residents have included comedians Ben Lyon and Bud Flanagan, actors Peter Finch and Thorley Walters, writer Radclyffe Hall, former Lord Chief Justice Lord Goddard, journalist Norman Cliff, tennis writer Bud Collins, Anne, Princess Royal, and Profumo affair topless showgirls Christine Keeler and Mandy Rice-Davies. Australian tennis player Rod Laver stayed at Dolphin Square for the 1969 Wimbledon championships during his Grand Slam season.

Soviet spy arrest
John Vassall, the Soviet spy, was arrested at apartment 807 in the square's Hood House in 1962. Oswald Mosley and his wife Diana Mitford, Lady Mosley, left their apartment at Dolphin Square for internment in 1940 during the Second World War.

Wartime base for Free French Government

Grenville House was the headquarters of General De Gaulle's Free French during World War II and number 308 Hood House was used by MI5 section B5(b) responsible for infiltrating agents into potentially subversive groups from 1924 to 1946.

Discredited allegations of child abuse
The Metropolitan Police Service opened an inquiry in November 2014 under Operation Fairbank into allegations that prominent MPs used the block of flats as a venue for child abuse. Carl Beech, then known publicly under the pseudonym "Nick", made false allegations against several prominent men, claiming that he was taken to Dolphin Square regularly as a young boy and abused.

Exaro and the BBC News both carried interviews with Beech in which he lied about being abused at Dolphin Square. The force simultaneously launched a related murder inquiry under the name Operation Midland, in relation to Beech's claims that he saw an MP strangle a child to death. On 21 March 2016, the Metropolitan Police announced that this had been closed without any charges. That year it emerged that Beech's statements were fabrications, and the police's coverage was rebuked for being seen to legitimise the claims. In 2019, Beech was convicted of making up allegations of a VIP paedophile ring.

In popular culture
Scenes in the 1967 sci-fi horror The Sorcerers were filmed in and around Dolphin Square.

The video for Culture Club's 1982 UK number one single "Do You Really Want to Hurt Me", was set, but not filmed, at the Dolphin Pool. The pool in the video is of a different architectural style, visibly not the Dolphin Pool.

In British novelist Kate Atkinson's 2018 spy novel Transcription, MI5 runs a small counterespionage operation from Nelson House in Dolphin Square.

References

Further reading

Terry Gourvish (2014) Dolphin Square: the history of a unique building, Bloomsbury.

External links

 
 Dolphin Square Tenants' Association
Conservation area audits: Dolphin Square Conservation Area Audit SPD (2008)

Buildings and structures in the City of Westminster
Buildings and structures on the River Thames
Residential buildings in London
Squares in the City of Westminster
Residential buildings completed in 1937
Pimlico
Art Deco architecture in London